Creative Commons Rights Expression Language (ccREL) is a proposed Rights Expression Language (REL) for descriptive metadata to be appended to media that is licensed under any of the Creative Commons licenses. According to the draft submitted to the W3C, it is to come in the forms of RDFa for (x)HTML pages and XMP for standalone media.

External links

Creative Commons

W3C submission 
 ccREL: The Creative Commons Rights Expression Language - W3C Member Submission 1 May 2008

FSF and GNU GPL 
 
 

Creative Commons
Metadata
Digital rights management standards